Andrea Dandolo (13067 September 1354) was elected the 54th doge of Venice in 1343, replacing Bartolomeo Gradenigo who died in late 1342.

Early life
Trained in historiography and law, Andrea Dandolo studied at the University of Padua, where he became a law professor until he was elected as doge.  He was descended from an old Venetian noble family, the Dandolo, that played an important role in Venetian politics from the 12th to 15th centuries, and produced four Venetian doges, of whom he was the last, numerous admirals and several other prominent citizens.

Dandolo's rise to prominence in Venetian public life was precocious.  In 1331, at the age of only 25, he was named procurator of St. Mark's Basilica.

Doge
He became doge in 1343 at the age of 37.

Dandolo was known as a benefactor of the arts.  To St Mark's Basilica he added the Chapel of San Isidoro, oversaw changes to the Pala d'Oro and expanded and beautified the Baptistery.

He reformed the Venetian legal code, formally proclaiming a legal framework in 1346 that compiled all of the applicable laws in the Republic.  He was a friend of Petrarch's, who wrote of Dandolo that he was "a just man, incorruptible, full of ardor and love for his country, erudite, eloquent, wise, affable and humane".

His reign was beset by challenges as Venice was struck by a violent earthquake on 25 January 1348 that caused hundreds of casualties, destroyed numerous buildings and, it was assumed at the time, provoked the terrible outbreak of the Black Death,  which did not end until 1350.  Between 1348 and 1350 a third of the population died.

Also Venice endured a disastrous war with the Hungarians following Zadar's seventh revolt against the Most Serene Republic in 1345.  Allied with the Hungarians, Genoa deployed a powerful naval fleet to the Adriatic under the command of Paganino Doria that devastated the Venetian territories and threatened Venice herself.  Venice was saved by the great naval victory of Lojera in 1353.

Dandolo was the last doge to be interred in St Mark's Basilica.

Writings
Dandolo wrote two chronicles in Latin on the history of Venice, the Chronica per extensum descripta aa. [ad annum] 46–1280 d.C. [dopo Cristo], written between 1344 and 1351/52, and the Chronica brevis aa. 46–1342 d.C., written before 1342, which can both be found in volume XII of Muratori’s collection Rerum Italicarum Scriptores.

References

Bibliography

1306 births
1354 deaths
14th-century Italian jurists
14th-century Doges of Venice
Andrea, Doge
University of Padua alumni
Academic staff of the University of Padua
Italian chroniclers
Burials at St Mark's Basilica